Blackwell is a series of five graphic adventure video games from independent game developer Wadjet Eye Games, created by Dave Gilbert. The plots of the games generally focus on Rosangela Blackwell, a spiritual medium, and her spirit guide Joey Mallone, who work to help ghosts transition to the afterlife.

Gameplay
All five games are point-and-click graphic adventure games.

Games

The Blackwell Legacy

The first game in the series, The Blackwell Legacy, was released on December 23, 2006. The protagonist of the game is Rosangela Blackwell (Rosa), who is a young freelance writer living a solitary life in New York City. Her only close relative, her aunt Lauren Blackwell, dies following years of being in a coma in the local hospital. Shortly afterward, Rosa is asked to write about a suicide in a college dorm for a small newspaper. Rosa experiences headaches throughout the day culminating in a ghost named Joey Mallone appearing in her apartment. He explains that she is a "medium" like her aunt and that her job is to help ghosts stuck in the real world to "move on". Reluctantly she accepts the explanation and proceeds to solve a case about the girl whose ghost is now haunting a dog park. She discovers that the girl is one of three close friends, who summoned a restless ghost with Ouija board; two of the friends have already committed suicide. She learns how to help the ghost. The third girl also attempts to commit suicide but is taken to the hospital, where Rosa finds her and the restless ghost. She then helps the ghost move on as well. Afterwards, Rosa asks Joey why did Lauren stop being a medium. Joey says it is because Lauren wanted to raise Rosa after the latter's parents died in a car accident. Pondering this, and with her writing career going nowhere fast, Rosa decides to follow in her aunt's footsteps and become a medium full-time.

Blackwell Unbound

The Blackwell Convergence

The Blackwell Deception

The Blackwell Epiphany

Characters

Rosa Blackwell
The main protagonist of the series, living in modern day New York City. Having been brought up in foster care after the early death of her parents and Institutionalisation of her aunt, Rosa is a reserved introvert who struggles with communication, though she is hardly interested in befriending others. She starts the series as a fledgling writer and journalist, but quickly embraces her role as a medium. Over the course of the series, she becomes determined and fierce in her resolve to help ghosts move on, even accumulating multiple restraining orders over the course of her work. She is incredibly defiant at times, and can be dismissive of Joey, but always cares enough to do the right thing.

Joey Mallone
The spirit guide of the Blackwell family. Joey originally hails from the Roaring 20s, working in a tailor shop before being gunned down by mobsters. Through an interesting chain of events not fully disclosed, he ended up becoming tied to the Blackwell family, starting with Rosa's grandmother. Joey is dry and sarcastic, frequently lamenting over the eternal and thankless nature of his work as a spirit guide, and is unable to be more than 30 feet away from his medium at all times. He does, however, genuinely care for the Blackwell women that he is stuck with, and tries his best to protect them when they are in danger.

Lauren Blackwell
Rosa's aunt on her father's side, and the protagonist of the second game. Lauren was a medium during the 70s in New York City. Though Lauren largely resigned to her life as a medium and resents it for separating her from her brother, she is still very amiable and, unlike Rosa, is able to charm info out of people more readily. Lauren would later adopt Rosa following her brother's untimely death, vowing to quit being a medium. However, she wound up being institutionalized for decades before finally dying at the beginning of the first game. She comically reveals in the final game that she had tried to prep Rosa for life as a medium by dressing up her prized teddy bear like Joey.

Nishanti Sharma
Rosa's next door neighbor within her apartment complex. Nishanti is an amiable extrovert, and is in many ways Rosa's polar opposite. Nishanti has a very high IQ and, despite not being a medium, is able to sense things many people cannot, often unwittingly pointing Rosa in the direction of more ghosts. She starts traveling in later games and during this time, communicates with Rosa only by email. She remains unaware of Rosa's nature as a spirit medium.

The Countess
The primary antagonist of the second and third games. The Countess was originally a spirit medium who lived during the Roaring 20s. Her real name is Jocelyn Contis. Unlike Rosa, Jocelyn resented her job as a medium, preferring to spend her nights dancing with her peers than with Madeline, her guide. Shortly after the Great Depression hit, Jocelyn decided to sever her connection to Madeline, and in doing so, she would go mad looking for a new spirit guide, and began referring to herself as the Countess. She would attach herself to other humans and, in the process, create more ghosts rather than help them move on. She is killed by Lauren, but doesn't rest until Rosa helps her spirit move on several decades later.

Madeline
An ally turned antagonist. Madeline appears to be of royal lineage of some European monarchy from several centuries prior, though some of her dialogue suggests that the era she once lived in is much more recent. At first, she is kind and helpful, providing Rosa with the assistance necessary to deal with the Countess. However, it is revealed later that she is numb and sociopathic, brought about by her work as a spirit guide and is unable to pass on. Originally serving as the spirit guide of the Countess, Madeline was abandoned by her and stuck in Limbo before plotting to return to life so that she may eventually die properly. To that end, she tried to possess the other mediums of the Blackwell family and take their bodies, only to fail and cause them to go insane. Madeline would then try to forcibly destroy her spirit at the cost of everyone else's, only to be stopped by Rosa. She eventually passes on in peace thanks to the efforts of Rosa.

Sam Durkin
Rosa's only ally in the NYPD. Gruff and tough, Sam is a detective who, after meeting Rosa in the fourth game, regularly employs her as a tipster to generate leads on cold cases, giving Rosa a critical financial lifeline. By his own choice, he does not ask for details about the nature of Rosa's abilities and keeps his distance from her, but otherwise respects Rosa. He is also the detective who saved Rosa from her aunt's tantrum when Lauren went insane, and thus continues to look out for Rosa even when the latter keeps getting into trouble with the law working as a medium.

Reception

Adventure Gamers gave 3.5/5 to the first four games, and 4.5/5 to Epiphany. Gamezebo gave 3.5/5 stars to Legacy and Unbound, 4/5 stars to Convergence and Epiphany, and 4.5/5 stars to Deception.

References

External links
 Official website of The Blackwell Legacy
 Official website of Blackwell Unbound
 Official website of The Blackwell Convergence
 Official website of The Blackwell Deception
 Official website of The Blackwell Epiphany

2006 video games
2009 video games
2011 video games
2014 video games
Android (operating system) games
Adventure Game Studio games
Video games about ghosts
Indie video games
IOS games
Linux games
MacOS games
Point-and-click adventure games
Video game franchises
Video games developed in the United States
Video games featuring female protagonists
Video games set in New York City
Video games with commentaries
Video game franchises introduced in 2006
Windows games
AGS Award winners